The 2006 European Speedway Club Champions' Cup.

Calendar

Semi-finals

Debrecen

Daugavpils

Final

References 
 uem-online.org - 2006 Track Racing results, pages 11–12.

See also 

2006
European C